is a town located in Kishima District, Saga Prefecture, Japan. As of October 1, 2016, the town has an estimated population of 6,680.

Geography
Mountains: The northern part of town gradually becomes mountainous.
Rivers: Rokkaku River
Lakes: The northern, mountainous part of town is dotted with ponds.

Adjoining Cities and Municipalities
Saga Prefecture
Taku
Takeo
Shiroishi
Kōhoku

History
April 1, 1889 - The village of Fukumo merges with the village of Ōmachi.
January 1, 1936 - The village of Ōmachi gains town status.

Economy
Agricultural Products: Rice, barley, cucumbers, strawberries, and chickens.
There was a coal mine which operated until 1960.

Education
Saga Prefectural Business High School
Ōmachi Junior High School
Ōmachi Elementary School

Transportation

Air
The nearest airport is Saga Airport

Rail
JR Kyushu
Sasebo Line
Ōmachi Station

Road
Expressways: None
National Highways: Route 34
Prefectural Roads: Saga Prefecture Route 36

Sister cities
 Allendale, New Jersey

References

External links

 Ōmachi official website 

Towns in Saga Prefecture